Riza Sapunxhiu (15 March 1925 – 6 September 2008) was a Kosovar communist politician and economist. He served as deputy prime minister and prime minister of Kosovo prior to becoming its representative in the Yugoslav Presidency.

Born in Peć, Sapunxhiu was an ethnic Albanian. From 1980 to 1982, he served as prime minister of Kosovo. In 1981, he headed the Kosovar delegation in a historical visit to Albania. This visit paved the way for closer relations between Albania and the Albanian community in Kosovo and the rest of Yugoslavia.

As a successful economist, in 1982, Sapunxhiu became an official at the World Bank.

When the Yugoslav crisis began, he supported the territorial integrity of Yugoslavia but did not effectually vote, though he was registered as voting pro. Nevertheless, the state of emergency was not declared due to opposition by other members of the presidency.

Notes

References

1925 births
2008 deaths
Politicians from Peja
Kosovo Albanians
Yugoslav Albanians
University of Belgrade Faculty of Economics alumni
League of Communists of Kosovo politicians